The Highland charge was a battlefield shock tactic used by the clans of the Scottish Highlands which incorporated the use of firearms.

Historical development

Prior to the 17th century, Highlanders fought in tight formations, led by a heavily armed warrior elite who carried heavy battle axes or claymores (two-handed swords whose name comes from the Scottish Gaelic claidheamh mòr "great sword").

However, with the introduction of muskets and cannon, such formations became vulnerable. As a result, in the 17th century, Highlander warriors developed a lighter, one-handed basket-hilted broadsword that protected the hand. This was generally used with a shield or targe strapped to the weak arm and a dirk or biotag "long knife" held in the other hand.

The Scottish and Irish warrior Alasdair Mac Colla is sometimes credited with inventing the Highland charge during the Wars of the Three Kingdoms to meet a particular set of battlefield challenges. It was initially known as the Irish charge, due to it first being implemented in Ireland, by Montrose's Irish brigade, before the Irish used it in Scotland again under Montrose. The use of the charge greatly resembled older Celtic fighting styles of battle in which one side would rush at the other in an attempt to break the line of battle.

The charge
The charge required a high degree of commitment as the men were rushing into musket range and would suffer casualties from at least one volley. Speed was essential, so the Highlanders preferred to employ the charge downhill and over firm ground; they removed clothing from their lower body for the same reason. They ran forward in clusters of a dozen (often blood relatives), which formed a larger, wedge-shaped formation. Once in effective musket range (60 yards), those with firearms would shoot; gun smoke from this mass discharge having obscured enemies' aim, the Highlanders obtained further protection from the expected return volley from the opposing force by crouching low to the ground immediately after firing. Then, firearms were dropped and edged weapons drawn, whereupon the men made the final rush on the enemy line with a Gaelic battle cry. Upon reaching striking distance, the Highlander would attempt to take the opponent's sword or bayonet point on his targe while lunging in low to deliver an upward thrust to his enemy's torso.

Bayonet technology and the charge

Before the adoption of ring attachments for bayonets, the attachment consisted of a plug inserted into the barrel, which meant a musket could not be fired or reloaded with a fixed bayonet. During their charge Highlanders made a relatively instant transition from firearms to swords as they swiftly closed with the opposing force. Those enemy soldiers with plug attachments (some carried a pike) had only moments to fix bayonets while under psychological pressure from the onrushing Highlanders brandishing swords and roaring their war cries. At the 1689 Battle of Killiecrankie Lowland Scots who were veterans of the Dutch wars were overwhelmed by Highlanders of clan Cameron; the Highlanders secured a complete victory by a charge which killed 2000 redcoats for the loss of 800 Highlanders.

The ring bayonet reduced the effectiveness of the Highland charge, but it remained an example of shock tactics, with the key factor being psychological; rather than being an attempt to cut through a solid enemy line, the charge aimed at causing some enemy troops in the opposing line to break ranks before contact, thereby leaving openings which could be exploited to 'roll up' the rest. This happened at the 1644 Battle of Tippermuir and the 1745 Battle of Falkirk Muir.

Culloden

One of the least successful uses of the Highland charge was in 1746 during the final confrontation of the Jacobite rising of 1745, the Battle of Culloden. The battle pitted the Jacobite forces of Charles Edward Stuart against an army commanded by Prince William, Duke of Cumberland loyal to the British government. The under-nourished and unpaid Jacobite force was badly outnumbered and outgunned by well-trained regular troops who maintained discipline when charged.

To the dismay of his military advisors, Charles Edward Stuart insisted on offering battle to the pursuing army of Cumberland on the open moorland of Culloden with the intention of fighting defensively, a decision that most historians have seen as playing into the hands of the government forces. The Jacobites failed to take advantage of the opportunity of attacking before the enemy had positioned their artillery and were ready for action. Cumberland's artillery bombarded the Jacobite army, which was stationary and exposed, until up to a third of Charles's men were dispersed or made casualties (including a groom decapitated while holding Charles Edward's horse). At this point – and without orders from the by now unnerved Jacobite command – Clan Mackintosh in the centre of the Jacobite line began to charge. Donald Cameron of Lochiel led the Camerons to join them and some other clans followed in a spontaneous, uncoordinated and disorganized charge in which many failed to use their firearms. Despite canister shot and volleys, the charge reached – and in places broke through – the Government front line (though many Highlanders were without targes to protect from bayonets). However, Coehorn mortar shelling and devastating enfilade musket fire from the deeply echeloned government forces killed those who had made a breakthrough, while the others, after suffering heavy casualties, fell back in a retreat that quickly became a rout.

Moore's Creek Bridge

The Battle of Moore's Creek Bridge, fought in 1776 in the Colony of North Carolina and one of the earliest battles of the American Revolution, has been called the "last Scottish Highland broadsword charge." It was fought between a collection of North Carolina Patriots and a loyalist force mainly composed of emigrant Scottish Gaels who had settled around the Cape Fear River. During the battle, the Highlanders attempted to charge the Patriots with their broadswords, but were gunned down due to the superior positions and equipment of the opposing side. At least 30 of the Scottish loyalists were killed, and many more were taken prisoner by the victorious rebels, who had by contrast lost only two men. The battle has been cited as one of the earliest major Patriot victories in the War of American Independence.

See also
 Military history of Scotland
 Human wave attack
 Battle of Prestonpans (1745)

References

History of the Scottish Highlands
Assault tactics
Wars involving Scotland